Louis Charles Bonaventure Alfred Bruneau (3 March 1857 – 15 June 1934) was a French composer who played a key role in the introduction of realism in French opera.

Life
Born in Paris, Bruneau studied the cello as a youth at the Paris Conservatory and played in the Pasdeloup orchestra. He soon began to compose, writing a cantata, Geneviève de Paris, while still a young man. In 1884, his Ouverture héroïque was performed, followed by the choral symphonies Léda (1884) and La Belle au bois dormant (1886). In 1887, he produced his first opera, Kérim.

The following year, Bruneau met Émile Zola, launching a collaboration between the two men that would last for two decades. Bruneau's 1891 opera Le Rêve was based on the Zola story of the same name, and in the coming years Zola would provide the subject matter for many of Bruneau's works, including L'attaque du moulin (1893). Zola himself wrote the libretti for the operas Messidor (1897) and L'Ouragan (1901). Other works influenced by Zola include L'Enfant roi (1905), Naïs Micoulin (1907), Les Quatres journées (1916), and Lazare (produced posthumously in 1954). Other operatic works by Bruneau contained themes by Hans Christian Andersen (Le Jardin du Paris in 1923) and Victor Hugo (Angelo, tyran de Padoue in 1928). Bruneau's orchestral works show the influence of Wagner. His other works include his Requiem (1888) and two collections of songs, Lieds de France and Chansons à danser.

Bruneau was decorated with the Legion of Honor in 1895. He died in Paris.

Bibliography
Arthur Hervey: Alfred Bruneau (London, 1907)
James Ross: '"Messidor": Republican Patriotism and the French Revolutionary Tradition in Third Republic Opera'; in: Barbara Kelly (ed.): 'French Music, Culture and National Identity, 1870-1939' (Rochester, N.Y., 2008), pp. 112–130; 
Steven Huebner: "Alfred Bruneau and Émile Zola" and "L'Attaque du moulin", in: French Opera at the Fin de Siècle (Oxford, 1999), pp. 395–425; 
Manfred Kelkel: Naturalisme, Vérisme et Réalisme dans l'opéra (Paris, 1984); 
Viking Opera Guide, ed. Holden (1993)

References

External links

1857 births
1934 deaths
19th-century classical composers
19th-century French composers
20th-century classical composers
Prix de Rome for composition
Burials at Batignolles Cemetery
Conservatoire de Paris alumni
French male classical composers
French opera composers
Male opera composers
Chevaliers of the Légion d'honneur
Musicians from Paris
20th-century French composers
20th-century French male musicians
19th-century French male musicians